The 2005 Black-Eyed Susan Stakes was the 81st running of the Black-Eyed Susan Stakes. The race took place on May 20, 2005, and was televised in the United States on the Bravo TV network owned by NBC. Ridden by jockey John Velazquez, Spun Sugar, won the race by three and three quarter lengths over runner-up R Lady Joy. Approximate post time on the evening before the Preakness Stakes was 5:14 p.m. Eastern Time and the race was run for a purse of $200,000. The race was run over a fast track in a final time of 1:53.27. The Maryland Jockey Club reported total attendance of 23,994.

Payout 

The 81st Black-Eyed Susan Stakes Payout Schedule

$2 Exacta:  (6–5) paid   $17.60

$2 Trifecta:  (6–5–1) paid   $78.40

$1 Superfecta:  (6–5–1–2) paid   $80.80

The full chart 

 Winning Breeder: Adena Springs; (KY)  
 Final Time: 1:53.27
 Track Condition: Sloppy
 Total Attendance: 23,994

See also 
 2005 Preakness Stakes
 Black-Eyed Susan Stakes Stakes "top three finishers" and # of starters

References

External links 
 Official Black-Eyed Susan Stakes website
 Official Preakness website

2005 in horse racing
2005 in American sports
2005 in sports in Maryland
Black-Eyed Susan Stakes
Horse races in Maryland